E. Bruce Nauman (1937–2009) was a professor of chemical engineering at Rensselaer Polytechnic Institute.

He obtained his B.S. degree in Nuclear Engineering from Kansas State University, a M.S. degree in Chemical Engineering from the University of Tennessee, and a Ph.D. degree in Chemical Engineering from the University of Leeds.

He joined RPI in 1981 as chair of the Department of Chemical Engineering, after a career in research and development with the Xerox Corporation and Union Carbide Corporation.   During the course of his tenure he oversaw thirty-two doctoral students. He died on May 24, 2009, after a battle with lung cancer.

Honors
 Fellow, American Institute of Chemical Engineers.
 Associate editor, The Chemical Engineering Journal, Transactions of the Institute of Chemical Engineers, and Butterworth Series in Chemical Engineering.
 Board member and past president, North American Mixing Forum of the AIChE.
 Member, Princeton University Advisory Council, 1980 to 1984.
 External examiner, University of Technology, Jamaica, 2002 to 2007
 Member, United States Military Academy Advisory Council. 2006 - 2009
 Winner of the NAMF Award of the American Institute of Chemical Engineers

Publications
Dr. Nauman has over 150 publications in the archival literature, 6 patents, 14 books chapters, including several chapters in Encyclopedia of Polymer Science and Engineering, and 24 miscellaneous publications. He is also author of 4 books:
Nauman, E. B., Chemical Reactor Design, Optimization and Scaleup, McGraw-Hill, New York, 2002.
Nauman, E. B., Introductory Systems Analysis  for Process Engineers, Butterworths, Boston, 1990.
Nauman, E. B., Chemical Reactor Design, Wiley, New York, 1987.
Nauman, E. B., and Buffham, B.A., Mixing in Continuous Flow Systems, Wiley,  New York, 1983.

References

External links
Website at RPI

American chemical engineers
Rensselaer Polytechnic Institute faculty
Kansas State University alumni
University of Tennessee alumni
1937 births
2009 deaths
20th-century American engineers